Aaron John Moog (born February 3, 1962) is a former American football defensive end who played for the Cleveland Browns of the National Football League (NFL). He played college football at UNLV.

References 

1962 births
Living people
American football defensive ends
UNLV Rebels football players
Cleveland Browns players